Lost Change is the debut studio album released by Black Eyed Peas frontman will.i.am. It was released on September 1, 2001 by Atlantic Records, and includes the song "I Am", co-written with Koliyah White. The album was supported by the release single "I Am".

Critical reception
Matt Conaway of AllMusic said the following about the album: "One of the early volumes in BBE's ambitious beat-suite series, will.i.am's Lost Change is a solid extension of the movement, cozily nestling between Jay Dee's "Welcome to Detroit", a more rhyme-orientated opus, and Pete Rock's Petestrumentals, a distinctly jazzy, instrumental-based endeavor. Though will has taken the instrumental-based series and put his own stamp on it, that stamp still contains occasional hues of Black Eyed Peas' early organic stylings - "Ev Rebahdee" featuring Planet Asia. Yet, BBE's progressive format frees him up to dabble in a menagerie of musical styles. And he's up to the challenge, as Lost Change fuses together aspects of jazz, electronica, funk, Caribbean, and trip-hop rhythms. While the straight-up rhyming tracks border on sublime "I Am" to humdrum "Money" featuring Huck Fynn, Oezlem, and Horn Dogs, it's the instrumental format where he truly flourishes. Showing a true knack for experimentation, the album leisurely darts back and forth between the reggae-scented "Possessions," "Lost Change", which coalesces jazzy horns, with junkyard band riffing, and the hazy electronic fuzz of "Thai Arrive," which unfolds like a Radiohead track. Similarly, "Lay Me Down" has the potential to be a break-out hit, as will's infectious snare claps and blissful horn snippets provide a cooled-out platform for Terry Dexter's soulful vocal scatting. On "Control Tower," will inserts a vocal clip that states, "I'm on the brink of a great achievement." A sophisticated and musically enthralling endeavor that still manages to be accessible, Lost Change does an admirable job of implementing a host of different styles, without losing the listener in the process."

Track listing

References

2001 debut albums
Will.i.am albums
Atlantic Records albums
Albums produced by will.i.am